Worst Bakers in America is an American cooking competition television series that aired on Food Network, presented by chefs Duff Goldman and Lorraine Pascale. The series is a spin-off of Worst Cooks in America.

The first season started on October 2, 2016. The second season started on July 22, 2019, with Jason Smith replacing Duff Goldman.

Season 1 (2016)

Recruits

Contestant progress
Red: Team Lorraine
Blue: Team Duff

 (WINNER) The contestant won the competition.
 (RUNNER-UP) The contestant made it to the finale, but did not win.
 (WIN) The contestant won the challenge for that week.
 (IN) The contestant performed well enough to move on to the next week.  
 (BTM) The contestant was one of the selection committee's least favorites for that week, but was not eliminated.
 (OUT) The contestant was the selection committee's least favorite for that week, and was eliminated.

Season 2 (2019)

Recruits

Contestant progress
Red: Team Lorraine
Blue: Team Jason

 (WINNER) The contestant won the competition.
 (RUNNER-UP) The contestant made it to the finale, but did not win.
 (WIN) The contestant won the challenge for that week.
 (IN) The contestant performed well enough to move on to the next week.  
 (BTM) The contestant was one of the selection committee's least favorites for that week, but was not eliminated.
 (OUT) The contestant was the selection committee's least favorite for that week, and was eliminated.

Notes

References

External links

2010s American cooking television series
2016 American television series debuts
American television series revived after cancellation
American television spin-offs
English-language television shows
Food Network original programming
Food reality television series
Reality television spin-offs
Television series by Optomen